Rock speedwell is a common name for several plants and may refer to:

Veronica arvensis
Veronica fruticans